The Adventurer is an ITC Entertainment British TV crime thriller/adventure series created by Dennis Spooner that ran for one series from 1972 to 1973.  It premiered in the UK on 29 September 1972.  The show starred Gene Barry as Gene Bradley, a government agent of independent means who poses as a glamorous American movie star.

The series contain plots and scenes that combine elements of the crime thriller, adventure, and secret agent drama genres.

Main cast
Gene Barry as Gene Bradley
Barry Morse as Mr. Parminter (25 episodes).
Catherine Schell as Diane Marsh (11 episodes)
Garrick Hagon as Gavin Taylor (10 episodes)

Supporting cast
Dennis Price as Brandon (3 episodes)
Stuart Damon as Vince Elliot (2 episodes)
Sue Gerrard as Jane (2 episodes, plus opening titles)

Episode list
 Miss Me Once, Miss Me Twice and Miss Me Once Again
 Poor Little Rich Girl
 Thrust and Counter Thrust
 The Bradley Way
 Return to Sender
 Counterstrike
 Love Always, Magda
 Nearly the End of the Picture
 Deadlock
 Has Anyone Here Seen Kelly?
 Skeleton in the Cupboard
 Target!
 Action!
 Full Fathom Five
 I'll Get There Sometime
 To the Lowest Bidder
 Going, Going...
 The Not-So Merry Widow
 Mr. Calloway Is a Very Cautious Man
 Double Exposure
 The Case of the Poisoned Pawn
 The Solid Gold Hearse
 Make It a Million
 Icons Are Forever
 Somebody Doesn't Like Me
 The Good Book

DVD release
A Region 2 DVD release of the show, which features interviews with Morse, Damon and Schell, is available from Network. Barry refused to be interviewed, and other cast members accused him of being "short-tempered" and "egomaniacal". Morse sums up the series in the DVD extras: "It wasn't the worst show ever made, but it certainly wasn't the best!"

External links
"The Morning After" ITC fansite
 
The Adventurer episode guide
The Official Barry Morse Website

Television series by ITC Entertainment
ITV television dramas
1970s British crime television series
1972 British television series debuts
1973 British television series endings
Television series by ITV Studios
1970s British drama television series